Dropout is a 1970 Italian romantic drama directed by Tinto Brass. It stars real-life couple, Franco Nero and Vanessa Redgrave. They also worked with Brass a year later on the drama La vacanza. Dropout was released in France on December 18, 1970, followed by a theatrical release in Italy on February 22, 1971.

Plot
Mary (Redgrave) is a disillusioned English banker's wife who meets a troubled Italian immigrant, Bruno (Nero). Mary is captivated by Bruno and they set off on a voyage together. In the course of their voyage, they meet a series of society's dropouts; the unemployed, drug addicts, drag queens, alcoholics and anarchists. They both learn a great deal about life from these misfits.

Cast
Franco Nero as Bruno
Vanessa Redgrave as Mary
Gigi Proietti as Cieco
Frank Windsor
Carlo Quartucci
Gabriella Ceramelli
Patsy Smart Darcus
Giuseppe Scavuzzo
Mariella Zanetti
Zoe Incrocci
Sam Dorras

Production
Carlo Ponti had originally agreed to produce the film but when he pulled out, Brass, Nero and Redgrave decided to cover the production costs themselves. Subsequently, shooting commenced on 1 June 1970.

References

External links
 Tinto Brass
 

1970 films
English-language Italian films
1970s Italian-language films
Films directed by Tinto Brass
Italian romantic drama films
1970 romantic drama films
Films shot in London
1970s English-language films
1970 multilingual films
Italian multilingual films
1970s Italian films